The white-winged cotinga (Xipholena atropurpurea) is a species of bird in the family Cotingidae. It is endemic to Brazil. Its natural habitat is subtropical or tropical moist lowland forest.
It is threatened by habitat loss.

References

External links
BirdLife Species Factsheet.

white-winged cotinga
Birds of the Atlantic Forest
Endemic birds of Brazil
white-winged cotinga
Taxonomy articles created by Polbot